Inka Tampu or Inkatampu (Quechua inka Inca, tampu inn, "Inca inn", Hispanicized and mixed spellings Incatambo, Inkatambo, Inca Tambo) is an archaeological site in Peru.

See also 
 Allpamayu
 Luq'umayu
 Wamanmarka
 Willka Wiqi

References 

Archaeological sites in Peru
Archaeological sites in Cusco Region